Alexa Demara is an American entrepreneur, writer and actress.

She has won numerous awards for modeling, acting, art, writing and academics.  Her innovative style has led to influential people paying homage to her or mimicking her in mainstream pop culture.

Career 
She has appeared in numerous print magazines such as FHM, MMA Sports, Fitness Experts, Star Central (Australia), Onda OK and has modeled for various designers such as Factory Timepieces Luxury Watches and Aicam Lacouri.  She has been featured and interviewed on various international web sites and in catalogs and newspapers, including the OC Register, The Nation (Thailand), Neue Zürcher Zeitung, Noticias Venezue and Black Star News.  She has done drama, improv and sketch comedy for film, television and stage.  Demara also supports various animal charities.

Demara got contacted by prominent people in the media, including top models, actors, sports stars, musicians and agents who helped propel her to fame at a young age. She won or placed in multiple modeling competitions, most notably being named one of the 'Top 10 Sexiest Women Online' by FHM and winning first place popular vote in a V Magazine annual model search.  Her first talent agents were in the commercial and literary genres. Her careers and pursuits led her to have one of the first large online social media followings on sites such as MySpace, leading her to be one of the first people to ever receive mainstream recognition from social media.  Being one of the first people to amass millions of views on social media, she had the most popular MySpace in the Midwest region.    Demara is featured in an alternative music video by the American rock band Madina Lake shown on MTV in multiple countries.

Her father is the co-owner of a financial advising service, and her mom is an accountant.  Members of Demara's family have been involved in the fashion, sports and political realms as well as featured on television and other media vehicles.  Demara's great aunt appeared in newspapers as a fashion model in the 1920s.

Demara has a bachelor's degree in marketing with a minor in Spanish, and she received scholarships for her GPA in both high school and college, where she joined Sigma Delta Pi.  She took part in the school's martial arts club and also took classes in self-defense, Tai Chi and kickboxing.  She has also studied Judo and Jiu-Jitsu.  She started her first marketing company one year after her college graduation.  She is also set to release books in paperback, her first one being a self-illustrated children's book.

Filmography

References

External links
 Official Web site

Living people
21st-century American actresses
21st-century American businesspeople
21st-century American businesswomen
American television actresses
American film actresses
American television personalities
American women television personalities
Year of birth missing (living people)